Unchained Melody: The Early Years or simply The Early Years is a compilation album by American country singer LeAnn Rimes, released in the United States on February 11, 1997 (see 1997 in music) by Curb Records. Due to high sales of her debut album, Blue, the album consists of tracks recorded previously to Blue (tracks one, two and five through nine were taken from Rimes' independent album, under Nor Va Jak label, All That (1994)). "Unchained Melody" (originally by The Righteous Brothers) was released on a single as a B-side track with "Put a Little Holiday in Your Heart" at Target stores during the 1996 Christmas season alongside Rimes' debut album. The album contains cover versions of "I Want to Be a Cowboy's Sweetheart" by Patsy Montana, "Blue Moon of Kentucky" by Bill Monroe, "I Will Always Love You" by Dolly Parton, "Yesterday" by The Beatles. The album has been certified 2× Platinum for shipments of two million copies in the United States. She was the fourth solo artist to chart on the Billboard 200 under the age of 18.

Background
Due to high sales of Rimes' debut album, Blue, Curb Records used several tracks recorded from Rimes' commercial album, All That, all of which were recorded when Rimes was eleven years old. The only songs not recorded prior to Blue is Rimes' cover of Bill Monroe's "Blue Moon of Kentucky" and the song "River of Love". "Unchained Melody" was originally released on a single as a B-side track with "One Way Ticket (Because I Can)" and again on the promotional CD single, "Put a Little Holiday in Your Heart", at Target stores during the 1996 Christmas season alongside Rimes' debut album before being released as a single on its own in December 1996. The compilation album was released on February 11, 1997 by Curb Records.

Despite Rimes also being a country singer, her cover of Dolly Parton's "I Will Always Love You" is done in the style of Whitney Houston's R&B cover.

Critical reception

Jose F. Promis of AllMusic gave the album two and a half out of five stars stating that it's "a tad bizarre" due to the album consisting of recordings released prior to Blue, that were recorded when Rimes was eleven years old, as a follow up to her debut album.

Track listing

Personnel
Credits for Unchained Melody: The Early Years were adapted from liner notes of All That. Additional credits adapted from liner notes of the album.

Bob Smith — bass guitar
Brad Billingsley — drums
Chuck Rippey — fiddle
Crista Carnes — background vocals
Curtis Randall — bass guitar
Fred Gleber — drums
Gary Beevers — dobro, steel guitar
Gary Leach — assistant mixing, assistant recording
Glenn Meadows — mastering
Greg Hunt — mixing, recording
Greg Walker — assistant producer, assistant mixing, assistant recording
Jerry Matheny — electric guitar
Jimmy Kelly — keyboards

Johnny Mulhair — acoustic guitar, co-producer, electric guitar, engineer, mandolin, mixing, recording, steel guitar
Joy Mckay — background vocals
Kayla Powell — background vocals
Kelly Glenn — keyboards
LeAnn Rimes — lead vocals
Lisa Criss — background vocals
Mike Mclain — keyboards, recording
Milo Deering — steel guitar
Paul Goad — bass guitar, keyboards, piano
Perry Coleman — background vocals
Ray Carl — harmonica
Whitney Mulhair — flute
Wilbur C. Rimes — producer, mixing

Charts
Unchained Melody: The Early Years debuted at #1 on Billboard 200 with 166,000 copies sold in the week ending of March 1, 1997, it dropped to #2 in its second week with 133,500 copies sold.

Weekly charts

Year end-chart

Sales

References

1997 compilation albums
Curb Records compilation albums
LeAnn Rimes albums